René Steichen (born 27 November 1942) is a Luxembourgian politician and jurist.

A member of the Christian Social People's Party (CSV), Steichen first held office as Mayor of Diekirch (1974–1984).  He entered the Chamber of Deputies in 1979.  In 1984, he entered the government as a Secretary of State, in which capacity he served until 1989, when he was promoted to Minister for Agriculture, Viticulture, and Rural Development.  In 1992, he became Luxembourg's European Commissioner, responsible for Agriculture and Rural Development.  Steichen remained in this capacity until 1995, when he was replaced as Luxembourg's European Commissioner by Jacques Santer, who was named President of the European Commission.

He is currently the chairman of SES S.A., the world's largest satellite operator and the largest component of Luxembourg Stock Exchange's premier LuxX index.

References
 EXECUTIVE PROFILE - René Steichen. Business Week. Retrieved 2011-03-16.
 Board of Directors. SES S.A. Retrieved 2011-03-16.

|-

Government ministers of Luxembourg
Luxembourgian European Commissioners
Mayors of Diekirch
Members of the Chamber of Deputies (Luxembourg)
Councillors in Diekirch
Christian Social People's Party politicians
Luxembourgian jurists
Luxembourgian businesspeople
1942 births
Living people
Ministers for Agriculture of Luxembourg